Viktor Dragolov (born 27 July 1988) is a Bulgarian footballer currently playing as a winger.

Career
Viktor Dragolov began playing football with Beroe Stara Zagora. He also played for Nesebar, Spartak Varna, Dobrudzha Dobrich, and Ethnikos Asteras.

External links

Onsports.gr profile

Living people
1988 births
Bulgarian footballers
Association football midfielders
PFC Nesebar players
PFC Spartak Varna players
PFC Dobrudzha Dobrich players
Second Professional Football League (Bulgaria) players
Ethnikos Asteras F.C. players
Paniliakos F.C. players